Edward Durham (August 19, 1906 – March 6, 1987) was an American jazz guitarist,  trombonist, composer, and arranger. He was one of the pioneers  of the electric guitar in jazz. The orchestras of Bennie Moten, Jimmie Lunceford, Count Basie, and Glenn Miller took great benefit from his composing and arranging skill.

With Edgar Battle he composed "Topsy", which was recorded by Count Basie and became a hit for Benny Goodman.

In 1938, Durham wrote "I Don't Want to Set the World on Fire" with Bennie Benjamin, Sol Marcus, and Eddie Seiler. During the 1940s, Durham created Eddie Durham's All-Star Girl Orchestra, an African-American all female swing band that toured the United States and Canada.

Early life
Durham was born in San Marcos, Texas, on August 19, 1906, to Joseph Durham Sr. and Luella Rabb (née Mohawk) Durham. From an early age, Durham performed with his family in the Durham Brothers Band. At the age of eighteen, he began traveling and playing in regional bands.

Pioneer on the electric guitar
From 1929, Durham started experimenting to enhance the sound of his guitar using resonators and megaphones.  In 1935, he was the first to record an electrically amplified guitar with Jimmie Lunceford in "Hittin' the Bottle" that was recorded in New York for Decca. In 1938, Durham recorded single string electric guitar solos with the Kansas City Five (or Six), which were both smallish groups that included members of Count Basie's rhythm section along with the tenor saxophone playing of Lester Young.

Discography

As leader
 Eddie Durham (RCA, 1974)
 Blue Bone (JSP, 1981)

As sideman
 Bennie Moten, Band Box Shuffle (2CD) (Hep 1929–32)
 Jimmie Lunceford, The Complete Jimmie Lunceford Vol. 3, 4, 5 (Decca, 1935–39) - Reissued in Europe by Medià 7
 Count Basie, The Complete Decca Recordings (3CD) (Decca 1937–41)
 Lester Young, Lester Young with the Kansas City Five (Commodore, 1938)
 Glenn Miller, The Complete Glenn Miller (13CD) (RCA Bluebird 1938–42)

Selected compositions and arrangements
 Bennie Moten: 
 "Moten Swing" (1932) (c, a)
 Jimmie Lunceford:
 "Rhapsody junior" (1935) with Edwin Wilcox
 "Oh! Boy" (1935)
 "Avalon" (1935)
 "Hittin' the Bottle" (1935)
 "Harlem Shout" (1936)
 "Runnig A Temperature" (1936)
 "Honey Keep Your Mind On Me" (1936)
 "Count Me Out" (1936)
 "Pigeon Walk" (1937)
 "Wham (Re.Bop.Boom-Bam)" (1939)
 "Lunceford Special" (1939)
 "Blues In The Groove" (1939)
 "It's Time To Jump And Shout" (1939)
 Count Basie: 
 "Time Out" (Decca, 1937)
 "Topsy" (Decca, 1937)
 "Swinging the Blues" (Decca, 1938)
 "Jumpin' at the Woodside" (Decca, 1938)
 Glenn Miller 
 "In The Mood" (RCA Bluebird 1939)
 "Slip Horn Jive"   (RCA Bluebird 1939)
 "Wham (Re.Bop.Boom-Bam)" (RCA Bluebird 1939)

See also
 International Sweethearts of Rhythm
 Eddie Durham's All-Star Girl Orchestra 
 List of jazz arrangers
 www.DurhamJazz.com

References

External links
 Eddie Durham recordings at the Discography of American Historical Recordings.

1906 births
1987 deaths
Guitarists from Texas
People from San Marcos, Texas
Swing arrangers
20th-century American guitarists
20th-century trombonists
African-American jazz musicians
American jazz guitarists
American jazz trombonists
American male guitarists
American music arrangers
Count Basie Orchestra members
Harlem Blues and Jazz Band members
International Sweethearts of Rhythm members
American male jazz musicians
Male trombonists
Oklahoma City Blue Devils members
Swing guitarists
Swing trombonists
African-American guitarists
Burials at George Washington Memorial Park (Paramus, New Jersey)
20th-century American male musicians